Port au Prince was built in France in 1790. The British Royal Navy captured her in 1793 off Port-au-Prince, Haiti. Her original name is currently unknown, but her new owners named her for her place of capture. She became a letter of marque, slave ship, and privateer cum whaler. In 1806 she anchored at a Tongan island where the local inhabitants massacred most of her crew and then scuttled her.

Career
Port au Princes origins are obscure. Although she appears to have been pierced for a large number of guns, perusal of a compendium of French naval vessels for the period 1786–1861 does not yield any likely candidates. She first appears in Lloyd's Register in 1794 with the notes that she was built in 1790, and was a French prize.

Her captain's name is given as H. Hayne, her owner's name variously as Muilman, Mulement, or Muilmen, and her trade as Portsmouth – "SDom". This last is a little problematical as the trade remains unchanged through 1796, and France took complete control of San Domingo in 1795. Furthermore, war with France had begun already in 1793. In any case, Henry Hayne received a letter of marque for Port au Prince on 5 March 1794

Ownership changed in 1796, at about the time she underwent repairs. Her new owner was Lee & Co., and her new captain William Corran (or Curran). He received a letter of marque dated 5 August 1796. Her trade changed to Liverpool – Africa, indicating that she had become a slave ship. A database of slave voyages from Liverpool indicates that in 1797 Port au Prince gathered slaves in the Bight of Biafra and Gulf of Guinea islands and delivered them to British Guiana. She sailed from Liverpool on 16 October 1796 and gathered slaves at Bonny Island. She delivered then 27 April 1797 to Demerara. She had embarked 359 slaves and landed 328 for a loss rate of 8.6%. Of her crew of 62 three died on the voyage. She arrived back at Liverpool on 29 September.

Ownership changed again in 1798. Port au Princes new owner was Thomas Parr & Co., and her trade became London – Demerara. In 1799 and 1800 her trade was London – Martinique. For all three years her captain was George Hall, who had received a letter of marque for her on 25 November 1797.

R. Bent & Co. acquired Port au Prince in 1800. Robert Bent had previously owned the slave ship Ellis, which the French Navy had captured in 1793. Port au Princes captain was Charles Kneal (or Kneale), who received a letter of marque on 7 June 1800. Her trade again became Liverpool—Africa. Kneale sailed from Liverpool on 7 July 1800, bound for Bight of Biafra. He gathered his slaves at Bonny Island and Gulf of Guinea islands, and delivered them to Kingston, Jamaica. She arrived 12 February 1801 and landed 383 slaves, having embarked 426, for a loss rate of 10.1%. She had sailed with a crew of 65 and had 50 men when she arrived at Kingston. Six men had died on the voyage. Port au Prince arrived back at Liverpool on 22 July.

The next year Captain William Blackie replaced Kneal. Because the Peace of Amiens had ended the French Revolutionary Wars, he did not apply for a letter of marque. He sailed Port au Prince on 28 March 1802 from London to West Central Africa and St Helena. He delivered the slaves he had gathered at Cabinda to Saint Croix in the Danish West Indies. He arrived there on 21 October. He had embarked 423 slaves and landed 380, for a loss rate of 10.2%. At some point Captain James Hall replaced Blackie. She arrived back at London on 3 March 1802.

In 1803 Port au Princes trade changed to London−Africa. The Napoleonic Wars had commenced and her new captain, Andrew Lawson, received a letter of marque on 25 July 1803. He sailed her to the Bight of Biafra and Gulf of Guinea islands, leaving London on 7 July 1803. He gathered his slaves at Bonny, and delivered them to Kingston, Jamaica on 15 April 1804. He had embarked 433 slaves and landed 389, for a loss rate of 10.2%. She sailed from Kingston on 12 June and arrived back at London on 14 August.

In 1805 Captain Isaac Duck replaced Lawson. Port au Princes trade changed to London—South Seas, i.e. to whaling. Duck received a letter of marque on 21 January 1805. Bent's plans for her had changed, not just her trade. Her complement had about doubled to 85 men, compared with the 20–45 of previous years. Clearly, she was to serve as a privateer as she would be over-manned for a trader, slaver, or whaler, but would require extra men if she was successful in capturing enemy vessels that would need prize crews to bring them back to friendly ports.

Last voyage and loss
Robert Bent, of London, gave Port au Prince a twofold commission. The primary goal was to sail to the Pacific and capture treasure from the Spanish colonies on the west coast of South America, but if unsuccessful in that endeavour she should hunt whales. Under the command of Captain Isaac Duck, she weighed anchor at Gravesend on 12 February 1805 on what was destined to be her last voyage. One of the men aboard Port au Prince was William Mariner, who survived her loss and eventually wrote a detailed account of the journey, and of the Tongans amongst whom he lived after they captured him. Most of the information below comes from his journals.

Port au Prince was reported "all Well" round Cape Horn in June 1805. She apparently captured several small Spanish vessels in the South Pacific, and looted some coastal towns.

Some of the crew of Minerva had mutinied, shot the master, and put in boats the officers and crew who would not join the mutiny.

On 17 September Port au Prince was reported at Chinka (Peru), in company with the privateer Lucy, Captain Alexander Ferguson. Ferguson had received a letter of marque on 10 January 1805. Lucy was of 345 tons (bm), had a crew of 60 men, and was armed with eighteen 9 & 18-pounder guns. Lucy too belonged to Robert Bent, and he had instructed Duck that if they were able to meet up, Duck and Ferguson should cooperate in privateering.

On 4 October Lucy and Port au Prince gave chase to a vessel that Lucy captured. The vessel was a tender to the Spanish frigate Astraea, then awaiting her at Paita. Two days later, Port-au-Prince and Lucy challenged Astrea to come out of the port of Paita and engage them. Astraea, of 44 guns, was under the command of a Frenchman, M. de Vaudrieul. In addition to her crew, Astrea had several hundred soldiers aboard. An inconclusive engagement followed in which Port au Prince lost a boy killed and had several men wounded, including Duck, before Astraea broke off the fight and returned to Paita. Some time later Port au Prince encountered the American vessel Neutrality and heard from her captain that Astraea had suffered 30 men killed, 120 men wounded, and damage to her fore-topmast. Supposedly, Vaudreuil had stated that at the end of the combat on the first day his Spanish officers had urged him to strike, and that he would have done so, had the two British vessels boarded him. However, Mariner reported that Astraea had on board several deserters from Port au Prince and that they had told Vaudreuil that Port au Prince was short of shot and men. Lucy had six men wounded, of whom five recovered. She also had one man killed, a Spanish prisoner, the captain of a felucca she had captured some time earlier.

Lucy transferred some shot to Port au Prince, and resupplied herself from the supplies that the tender had been delivering to Astraea. The British put a prize crew on the tender and sent her to James Island, in the Gallipago Islands.

Two days after the initial engagement the two British vessels again attempted to capture Astraea, but she repelled their attack. She was anchored and easily able to fire on them as they sailed past. Port au Prince had one man killed.

Port au Prince and Lucy then sailed to the Galapagos, arriving at Chatham Island on the 16th. The prize they had sent to the islands was not there and nothing further was ever heard of her. Port au Prince and Lucy divided equally the silver and dollars they had captured while operating together. The two then separated.

On 30 March 1806 Port au Prince captured the Spanish brig Santa Isidora, Captain Josef Evernzega, master, about  half-a-dozen miles off Acapulco. Santa Isidora had been sailing from Guiàquil to Acapaculco with a cargo of cocoa. Duck put the Spanish prisoners in her boats so that they could reach the town. He then put Mr. John Parker in charge of the brig and gave him ten crew men and provisions for four months with instructions to sail for Port Jackson. Santa Isidora never arrived at New South Wales. One report was that the inhabitants of the Paumotu Islands captured her and massacred the crew.

On 18 June 1806 Port au Princes boats entered San Blas (possibly San Blas, Nayarit), and captured Santa Anna. Santa Anna was a "corbetta" under the command of Captain Francisco Puertas and carrying a cargo of pitch, tar, and cedar boards to Guayaquil. The next day Duck sent 20 of his Spanish prisoners ashore in his longboat. Two Spaniards and two negro slaves joined Port au Prince. The slaves belonged to Santa Annas owner and legally Duck should have sent them ashore too, but they pleaded not to have to go ashore and Duck yielded to their pleas. Duck then put Mr. Charles Maclaren in command of Santa Anna and gave him a crew of 12 men plus a Spaniard to navigate her. Santa Anna did reach Port Jackson, where Maclaren sold her per his instructions. Her new owners then employed Santa Anna as a whaler.

Port au Prince turned back to whaling and killed some 15 whales; she also killed over 8000 seals for their skins. Captain Duck died on 11 August and Mr. William Brown, the whaling master, replaced him in command.

She dropped anchor again for the last time on 29 November 1806 at an island called Lefooga in the Ha'apai Group, Kingdom of Tonga. It was here that the Tongans reportedly massacred Captain Brown and 36 men of her 62-man crew, and burnt the ship to the waterline after removing all her arms and whatever else they found useful. However, in May 1832,  stopped at Keppel's Island. There she found William Brown, J. Roberts (a negro), and all survivors of Port au Prince. Either Brown or Roberts was acting as interpreter for the king there.

If Port au Prince had been successful in capturing treasure from the Spaniards, her haul of treasure went down with her.

Rumours
Well after the Tongans had seized and scuttled Port au Prince and murdered her crew, Lloyd's List (LL) reported two third-party reports about her. On 30 September 1808, LL reported that "'Port au Prince', of London, which was reported captured around Cape Horn, was well at the Marquisa Islands about 5 Months since." She was reported to have been at Rio de Janeiro on 25 November 1808.

Then on 19 May 1809, Lloyd's List reported "The Port au Prince, of London, is taken at Tongataboo Island, in the South Pacific Ocean. Crew killed."

Discovery of the wreck
In August 2012, the wreck of Port au Prince was discovered off the coast of Foa Island, in Tonga.

The Greenwich Maritime Museum and the Marine Archaeological Society both confirmed the age of the wreck after analysing copper sheathing found at the site. The sheathing was only used between 1780 and 1850 to combat shipworm and marine weeds and so given the location of the wreck it is considered likely to be the remains of Port au Prince.

Notes

Citations

References
 
 
 
 
 
 
 
 
 

Privateer ships of the United Kingdom
Shipwrecks in the Pacific Ocean
Tall ships of the United Kingdom
1790 ships
Captured ships
London slave ships
Whaling ships
Scuttled vessels
Ship fires
Maritime incidents in 1806
Age of Sail merchant ships
Merchant ships of the United Kingdom
2012 archaeological discoveries